The 2017 LFA season was the second season of the Liga de Fútbol Americano Profesional. This season saw two new franchises join the league: Dinos(short for "dinosaurios", the Spanish word for dinosaurs) and Fundidores(Spanish for smelters or founders) to bring the league to a total of 6 teams. The regular season began on February 18 and concluded on April 9. The Tazón México II was played on April 30 with the Mayas defeating the Raptors to win their second LFA championship.

News 
On September 28, 2016, the LFA announced its expansion for the 2017 season: the Monterrey Founders and the Saltillo Dinos.

Prior to the Mexico II Bowl, the visiting team, Dinos, was about to cancel the match since they had to travel by bus 10 hours from Saltillo to Mexico City, get to play and return immediately, with no opportunity to train or rest before the game, which put them at a notable disadvantage. The LFA had no budget to pay for airplanes and hotels for players and staff members.

Due to the increase in teams for the 2017 season, the LFA made some changes in the competition format, creating two divisions, the North and the center, although for sponsorship reasons these divisions were named after commercial products. The new format included divisional championships to be played in the postseason, the winners of which would go to the Tazón México.

The salary cap per franchise was 650,000 MXN (US$30,000 ).

Coaching changes
Eagles: José Campuzano replaced Antonio Sandoval as head coach for the Eagles after a 3–3 season

Standings 
Note: GP = Games played, W = Wins, L = Losses, PF = Points for, PA = Points against, Diff=Difference between pts. for and against

Teams in bold qualified for the playoffs

Results

Playoffs

Playoff bracket 

  * Indicates overtime victory

Tazón México II 

The Tazón México II (called Indian Motorcycle Tazón México II for sponsorship reasons) was the second edition of the LFA championship game. The Mayas obtained repeat championships by winning against Dinos at the Estadio Jesús Martínez "Palillo" in Mexico City, by a score of 24–18. The MVP of the game was QB Marco Garcia.

Awards 
Following the season, awards are shown the best of the 2017 season.

References

2017 in American football
LFA
LFA seasons